Ganjabad-e Yek (also Romanized as Ganjābād-e Yek; also known as Ganjābād) is a village in Sorkh Qaleh Rural District, in the Central District of Qaleh Ganj County, Kerman Province, Iran. At the 2006 census, its population was 956, in 209 families.

References 

Populated places in Qaleh Ganj County